The Jarbidge Mountains are a mountain range in northern Elko County, Nevada, United States. The range includes multiple sub-ranges, including the Bruneau Range, Buck Creek Mountains, Copper Mountains, Elk Mountains, Fox Creek Range, Ichabod Range, Marys River Range, Salmon River Range and Wild Horse Range.

The central core of the Jarbidge Mountains, along with the Elk Mountains, Fox Creek Range and Marys River Range, are contained within the Jarbidge Ranger District of the Humboldt-Toiyabe National Forest. The central Jarbidge Mountains and Marys River Range are also included within the Jarbidge Wilderness. Most of the other sub-ranges west of the central core are included within the Mountain City Ranger District. The Salmon River Range is the only sub-range not included within the Humboldt-Toiyabe National Forest.

The highest peaks in the range include:
Matterhorn Peak .
Jarbidge Peak 
Square Top Mountain 
Jumbo Peak 
Marys River Peak  (two miles south-southeast of the main crest in the Marys River Range)
Cougar Peak 
Prospect Peak  (one mile east of the main crest)
God's Pocket Peak  (four miles east of the main crest in the Marys River Range)

"Jarbidge" is a name derived from the Shoshone language meaning "devil". Indians believed the hills were haunted.

References

External links 
 Jarbidge Mountain Trip on IdahoSummits.com
 Jarbidge Ranger District

Mountain ranges of Nevada
Mountain ranges of Elko County, Nevada
Humboldt–Toiyabe National Forest
Mountain ranges of the Great Basin